Tachina brunneri is a species of fly in the genus Tachina of the family Tachinidae that is endemic to Serbia.

References

Insects described in 1873
Diptera of Europe
Endemic fauna of Serbia
brunneri